John Thomas Macpherson (1872–1921) was a Labour Member of Parliament for the United Kingdom House of Commons constituency of Preston.

A one-time cabin boy, steel smelter and founder of the Steel Smelters' Society he was elected to represent Preston at the United Kingdom general election of 1906. His first recorded question in the House of Commons concerned the wages of armour-plate makers.

At the time of the 1910 Rotherham by-election, Macpherson was an official of the British Steel Smelters, Mill, Iron and Tin-plate Workers’ Union and the union was said to be strong in the Rotherham constituency and willing to pay for his deposit and other expenses to stand in the election.

References

External links
 http://hansard.millbanksystems.com/people/mr-john-macpherson
 

1872 births
1921 deaths
Labour Party (UK) MPs for English constituencies
UK MPs 1906–1910